Wirfin Y. Obispo Vargas (born September 26, 1984) is a Dominican professional baseball pitcher for the Acereros de Monclova of the Mexican League. He previously played in Nippon Professional Baseball for the Yomiuri Giants of the Central League (2007–2010) and Hokkaido Nippon Ham Fighters of the Pacific League (2011).

Career

Boston Red Sox
Obispo was originally signed by the Boston Red Sox as an international free agent on January 20, 2002. He played in the Dominican Summer League with the DSL Red Sox as a shortstop before being released on November 3, 2003.

Cincinnati Reds
On January 23, 2004, Obispo signed a minor league contract with the Cincinnati Reds organization. Obispo appeared in 14 games for the DSL Reds in 2006, recording a 4-5 record and 2.04 ERA.

Yomiuri Giants
Obispo signed with the Yomiuri Giants of Nippon Professional Baseball for the 2007 season, but only made 2 appearances for the club, pitching a scoreless inning in total. In 2008, Obispo appeared in 37 games for Yomiuri's minor league club, recording a 4.24 ERA with 41 strikeouts, but did not play with the main team. In 2009, Obispo pitched in 14 games for Yomiuri, registering a 6-1 record and 2.45 ERA with 48 strikeouts. Obispo won the 2009 Japan Series with the Giants that year. In 2010, Obispo pitched to a 5.21 ERA with 22 strikeouts in 14 games for the Giants.

Hokkaido Nippon-Ham Fighters
On November 6, 2010, Obispo was traded to the Hokkaido Nippon-Ham Fighters in exchange for outfielder Toshimasa Konta and southpaw Hideki Sunaga. Obispo only made 2 appearances for the Fighters in 2011, allowing 6 runs in 1.0 inning of work.

Cincinnati Reds (second stint)
On February 2, 2012, Obispo signed a minor league contract with the Cincinnati Reds organization. He split the 2012 season between the Triple-A Louisville Bats and the Double-A Pensacola Blue Wahoos, where he pitched to a 5-3 record with a 3.00 ERA in 35 games, 13 of them starts.

Atlanta Braves
On November 5, 2012, Obispo signed a minor league deal with the Atlanta Braves organization that included an invitation to spring training. He spent the 2013 season with the Triple-A Gwinnett Braves, registering a 2-4 record and 3.53 ERA in 54 games. The Braves added him to their 40-man roster on November 1, 2013. On May 31, 2014, Obispo was designated for assignment by the Braves following the promotion of Shae Simmons.

Pittsburgh Pirates
On June 1, 2014, Obispo was claimed off waivers by the Pittsburgh Pirates and was assigned to the Triple-A Indianapolis Indians. On August 13, 2014, Obispo was designated for assignment by the Pirates after they claimed Ramon Cabrera off waivers. On August 21, Obispo was outrighted to Indianapolis.

Milwaukee Brewers
On December 2, 2014, Obispo signed a minor league contract with the Milwaukee Brewers organization. He was assigned to the Double-A Biloxi Shuckers to begin the season. He pitched to a 1.99 ERA in 24 games for Biloxi and the Triple-A Colorado Springs Sky Sox before being released on July 25, 2015.

Sultanes de Monterrey
On February 2, 2016, Obispo signed with the Sultanes de Monterrey of the Mexican League. He was named an All-Star that season after pitching to a 6-5 record with a 3.15 ERA in 48 games. Obispo was again an All-Star in 2017, after recording a stellar 2.12 ERA and a 7-5 record with 99 strikeouts in 57 appearances. Obispo was an All-Star for a third straight year in 2018, striking out 77 in 52 games. Obispo earned his fourth LMB All-Star nod in 2019, after he pitched to a 2.62 ERA and 6-5 record with 77 strikeouts. Obispo did not play in a game in 2020 due to the cancellation of the Mexican League season because of the COVID-19 pandemic. In 16 games with Monterrey in 2021, Obispo logged a 1-3 record and 3.86 ERA.

Pericos de Puebla
On July 2, 2021, Obispo was traded to the Pericos de Puebla of the Mexican League. In 2 appearances, he registered a 13.50 ERA and gave up 3 runs (1 earned).

Acereros de Monclova
On July 12, 2021, Obispo was traded to the Acereros de Monclova of the Mexican League in exchange for pitchers David Richardson and Adam Quintana.

Legal issues
On November 23, 2020, Obispo was arrested in the Dominican Republic after confronting police with a shotgun when he was out past curfew.

References

External links

1984 births
Living people
Acereros de Monclova players
Biloxi Shuckers players
Dominican Republic expatriate baseball players in Japan
Dominican Republic expatriate baseball players in Mexico
Dominican Republic expatriate baseball players in the United States
Dominican Summer League Reds players
Estrellas Orientales players
Gwinnett Braves players
Hokkaido Nippon-Ham Fighters players
Indianapolis Indians players
Louisville Bats players
Mexican League baseball pitchers
Nippon Professional Baseball pitchers
Pensacola Blue Wahoos players
Pericos de Puebla players
Sportspeople from San Pedro de Macorís
Sultanes de Monterrey players
Yomiuri Giants players